2022 Florida Amendment 1 was a proposed amendment to the Florida Constitution, which failed on November 8, 2022. Through a statewide referendum, the amendment achieved only 57.26% support among voters in the U.S. state of Florida, short of the 60% majority required by state law. Had the amendment passed, it would have granted state lawmakers the power to change property tax rules regarding flood resistance.

References 

2022 in Florida
Legal history of Florida
Constitutional amendments
Government of Florida